Jyoti Kalani, (17 February 1951– 18 April 2021) was an Indian politician from Ulhasnagar (a suburb of Mumbai, India). She emerged on her own during the years when her husband was out of power or in prison. She became the president (mayor) of the powerful Ulhasnagar Municipal Council. Later, she too faced several charges of intimidation and forgery.

Kalani died on 18 April 2021, aged 70, of a heart attack.

References

External links

1951 births
2021 deaths
Women mayors of places in Maharashtra
People from Thane district
Mayors of places in Maharashtra
Maharashtra municipal councillors
People from Ulhasnagar
Maharashtra MLAs 2014–2019
Women members of the Maharashtra Legislative Assembly
Indian National Congress politicians from Maharashtra
21st-century Indian women politicians
Nationalist Congress Party politicians from Maharashtra